Ghosts of War is a 2020 British supernatural horror film written and directed by Eric Bress. The film stars Brenton Thwaites, Theo Rossi, Skylar Astin, Kyle Gallner, and Alan Ritchson. It was released on DirecTV on 18 June 2020.

Plot
During the Allied campaign across France in 1944, five troopers of the 82nd Airborne Division are assigned to guard a chateau. En route they ambush a German-captured jeep, executing the occupants who survive the initial attack, before encountering a group of Jewish refugees. They arrive at their destination, and the troops they're replacing clear out hurriedly. Chris, the group's commander, interprets a repetitive banging sound coming from the fireplace as Morse code, which Eugene transcribes as saying "I have no legs". Eugene later finds a journal kept by a German soldier detailing the fate of the Helwigs, the former owners. The Germans, having discovered the Helwigs had been sheltering Jews, brutally murdered them by burning the father alive, hanging the daughter and drowning the son in a bathtub. As Eugene is transcribing another Morse code message, his hand moves without his volition to spell out the message "If you leave, you die". That night, a German patrol attacks. The Americans kill most of their number but Butchie is mortally wounded diving on a grenade. Elsewhere, the men witness some of the Germans being killed by unseen forces in the same manner as the Helwig family. Before he dies, Butchie rants that what the men are experiencing isn't real and exhorts Chris to "remember".

Convinced that the building is haunted, the survivors leave only to find themselves repeating the experiences that brought them to the chateau - the ambush of the jeep, the encounter with the refugees. Believing they are cursed and that their only hope is to give the bodies of the Helwig family a proper burial, they return to the chateau. An invisible force grabs Chris and hauls him towards an outhouse where they find the Helwigs' remains. After burying the bodies, Eugene consults the diary and finds that the text is no longer German but Arabic and that the Helwigs were Afghan. The men are then attacked by spirits, one of which tries to drown Chris. The shock of the experience induces hallucinations before he finally snaps awake and finds himself being attended to by doctors in a futuristic hospital, surrounded by the mutilated and unconscious bodies of his comrades. Doctor Engel and his staff inform Chris that what he and his comrades had been experiencing is a simulated reality based on World War II intended to help soldiers suffering from post-traumatic stress disorder.

Chris' memories return. He and his men are not World War II veterans but soldiers of the present-day American military. Their final mission in Afghanistan was to evacuate a family called the Helwigs, who had been collaborating with the Americans, before an Islamic State patrol ambushed them. Ordered to hide by their CIA handler, the men watched as the Helwigs were slaughtered in the manner witnessed in the simulation. As the men left, the despairing mother of the family detonated a suicide bomb and with her dying breath uttered the word "Vetrulek", revealed to be an ancient curse that forces its recipients to endlessly relive their trauma. Back in the hospital the power fluctuates, confusing the medical staff. Chris realises that the curse is real and that the spirits of the Helwig family now haunt the simulation that the men are experiencing. Convinced the only way to lift the curse is to confront the family, apologise and atone for their sins, Chris explains this to the medical staff, and insist asking to returns to the simulation. While the medical staff is preparing Chris' reconnection to the simulation, they are confused by the mainframe computer launching deletion of the patient memory. They shout that fact to Chris just before the countdown for sending him back announce five seconds to resume link to the construct. Finally, the timer reach zero and procedure initiate. He reawakens where his experiences began - camped out at night with his comrades as a figure watches from the shadows.

Cast
 Brenton Thwaites as Chris
 Kyle Gallner as Tappert
 Alan Ritchson as Butchie
 Theo Rossi as Kirk
 Skylar Astin as Eugene
 Billy Zane as Dr Engel
 Shaun Toub as Mr Helwig
 Alexander Behrang Keshtkar as Leader
 Kaloyan Hristov as Helwig Boy
 Yanitsa Mihailova as Christina Helwig

Production
In February 2017, it was reported that Brenton Thwaites would star in Ghosts of War, with Bress directing from his own script. Miscellaneous Entertainment's D. Todd Shepherd, Shelley Madison, Joe Simpson, and George Waud are producing and financing the film alongside Colleen Camp. A month later, Skylar Astin, Theo Rossi, Alan Ritchson, Kyle Gallner, and Shaun Toub were cast in the film.

Highland Film Group is handling international sales. Principal photography took place in Sofia, Bulgaria. Using the Vrana Palace as the mansion.

Release
Ghosts of War released on DirecTV on 18 June 2020. It was released via virtual cinema screenings, On Demand, and digitally on 17 July 2020.

Reception
The website's critics consensus reads: "Ghosts of War blends supernatural horror and period war drama to produce a muddled mashup that proves some ingredients are better left separate." On Metacritic, the film has a weighted average score of 38 out of 100 based on 8 critics, indicating "generally unfavorable reviews". Russian horror webzine "Darker" review states that Ghosts of War can boast one of the most cliched and at the same time insanely convoluted endings of all time, making events of the movie pointless.

References

External links
 

2020 films
2020 horror films
2020s supernatural horror films
2020s war films
British supernatural horror films
British war films
Films about curses
Films about virtual reality
Films about post-traumatic stress disorder
Films scored by Michael Suby
Films shot in Sofia
Horror war films
Supernatural war films
Vertical Entertainment films
War in Afghanistan (2001–2021) films
Films set in Afghanistan
Western Front of World War II films
Films about the United States Army
2020s English-language films
2020s British films